The Canon de 130 mm Modèle 1924 was a medium-caliber naval gun used as the primary armament on a number of French destroyers during World War II.

Description
The Canon de 130 mm Modèle 1924 had an autofretted built-up barrel and a Welin breech block. Useful life expectancy was 900 effective full charges (EFC) per barrel. These guns were carried in low-angle single turrets on destroyers. They had an automatic spring rammer, but loading was difficult at elevations over 15°.

Ammunition 
Ammunition was of a separate loading QF type. It was the same as that used by the earlier Canon de 130 mm Modèle 1919.

The gun was able to fire: 
 Semi Armour-Piercing - 
 High Explosive - 
 Illumination - Unknown

Naval Service

Ship classes that carried the Canon de 130 mm Modèle 1924 include:
 L'Adroit-class destroyers
 Wicher-class destroyers - built in France for the Polish Navy

Notes

References

External links 
 http://www.navweaps.com/Weapons/WNFR_51-40_m1924.php

Naval guns of France
130 mm artillery